McKenzie Milton (born October 10, 1997) is a former American football quarterback who previously played for the Florida State Seminoles of the Atlantic Coast Conference and the University of Central Florida (UCF) of the American Athletic Conference.

College career

UCF
Milton was a three-star dual-threat quarterback from Mililani High School in Mililani, Hawaii. He chose UCF because of new head coach Scott Frost, the former offensive coordinator of Heisman winning quarterback Marcus Mariota, whom Milton had idolized in high school. Milton started 10 games his freshman year leading the Knights to a 6–6 regular season record and an appearance in the Cure Bowl. The previous year, the Knights had gone 0–12. In his Sophomore year, Milton led the Knights to a 12–0 regular season record, winning the AAC and eventually the Peach Bowl against the SEC runner-up Auburn Tigers. Milton was named the AAC offensive player of the year. Milton placed 8th in the Heisman vote for 2017. Milton was named the offensive MVP in the 2018 Peach Bowl, despite not reaching a 50% completion rating (he had only been below 60% once for the entire 2017 year, and never below 50%), Milton threw for two touchdowns and went 13/18 in the second half. He ended the game 16 of 35 with 242 yards, 2 touchdowns and no interceptions. Milton also excelled with his legs, picking up 116 yards on the ground and scoring a touchdown, which led all UCF rushers. This was UCF's first ever Peach Bowl win, and second New Year's Six win in four years. Following the game, the school claimed a national championship.

Injury and aftermath 
On November 23, 2018, UCF played the last game of the regular season against in-state rival University of South Florida. Early in the second quarter, Milton pulled the ball on a belly option and ran right. He was tackled by two USF players. This caused Milton to dislocate his knee. He was carted off the field and then rushed to nearby Tampa General Hospital. Upon arrival, doctors found extensive damage to the arteries and nerves in his right knee. Emergency surgery was undertaken to restore arterial blood flow; this involved taking the saphenous vein out of his left leg and transferring the vessel to the right leg to restore blood flow to that limb. The surgery was successful. Two more surgeries followed over the course of several days. Milton was discharged from the hospital on November 30. Milton underwent reconstructive knee surgery in January 2019.

In an interview he gave for ESPN's Andrea Adelson as the second anniversary of his injury approached, Milton publicly revealed for the first time that he had to undergo two subsequent operations. He was walking again in the late spring of 2019, but in July woke up with what Adelson described as "searing pain" in the rebuilt knee and was unable to walk. He immediately saw a physician who put a needle in that knee, drawing out pus. The doctor told Milton that he needed an immediate surgery to keep him from losing the cadaver tissue that had been used in the initial reconstruction. After that surgery, Milton had a peripherally inserted central catheter installed for daily antibiotics, but an MRI revealed a pocket of pus behind the rebuilt knee, leading to another surgery near the start of the 2019 season. In the 2020 interview, Milton estimated that the infection set his recovery back six months. He was eventually cleared to resume football activity during the summer of 2020, and ran UCF's scout team in that season.

Florida State
In a video posted by UCF Football on December 3, 2020, Milton announced that he would seek a transfer for the 2021 college football season. Milton stated in the video that he believed "It's Dillon Gabriel's team now" and would not want to remove Gabriel from the spotlight. On December 13, 2020, Milton announced that he would be transferring to Florida State University to play for coach Mike Norvell.

On September 5, 2021, he returned for his first game since the injury. On his first throw in Florida State's game against Notre Dame, he threw a complete pass. Notre Dame won the game in overtime 41–38. McKenzie completed 5 passes of 7 attempts for 48 yards and led the Seminoles back from a 10-point deficit late in the 4th quarter to tie the game and force overtime.

NIL venture 
On July 1, 2021, NCAA student-athletes were allowed to receive compensation for use of their name, image, and likeness (NIL) for the first time, and Milton was one of the first athletes to take advantage of the new rules. He and Miami quarterback D'Eriq King became the co-founders and public faces of Dreamfield, a company specializing in booking live appearances for student-athletes. Dreamfield also offers non-fungible tokens (NFTs), digital art works that cannot be duplicated and are purchased with cryptocurrency. Milton was the subject of Dreamland's first NFT auction, set for July 6, 2021.

College statistics

References

Notes

External links
 UCF Knights bio
 McKenzie Milton Official Website
 McKenzie Milton Official Apparel

1997 births
Living people
American football quarterbacks
Florida State Seminoles football players
People from Honolulu County, Hawaii
Players of American football from Hawaii
UCF Knights football players